Zdravko Rajačić (29 May 1952 – 3 October 2008) was a Serbian professional basketball coach who coached OKK Beograd during the 1980s.

References

1952 births
2008 deaths
OKK Beograd coaches
Serbian men's basketball coaches
Sportspeople from Belgrade
Yugoslav basketball coaches